Gerard Lopez may refer to:

 Gerard López (born 1979), Spanish retired footballer
 Gérard Lopez (psychiatrist) (born 1949), French psychiatrist
 Gérard Lopez (businessman) (born 1971), Luxembourgian-Spanish entrepreneur and businessman